(born 31 October 1985 in Tokyo, Japan) is a Japanese rugby union player. Kawamata has played 18 international matches for the Japan national rugby union team.

Kawamata was a member of the Japan team at the 2011 Rugby World Cup, playing one match against event winners the All Blacks

References

Living people
1985 births
Japanese rugby union players
Saitama Wild Knights players
Japan international rugby union players
Rugby union props
Toyota Industries Shuttles Aichi players
Mitsubishi Sagamihara DynaBoars players